Columbia Revolt is a 50-minute, black-and-white documentary film about the Columbia University protests of 1968.  The film was made that year by a collective of independent filmmakers called Newsreel and mostly shot by Melvin Margolis.  It features a number of off-camera interviews with unnamed students who were involved in the takeover of university buildings.

According to Roz Payne, a member of the Newsreel collective who worked on the film:

The students had taken over 5 buildings. We had a film team in each building. We were shooting from the inside while the rest of the press were outside. We participated in the political negotiations and discussions. Our cameras were used as weapons as well as recording the events. Melvin had a World War II cast iron steel Bell and Howell camera that could take the shock of breaking plate glass windows.

The film is sympathetic to the students and is shot in a Cinéma vérité style. It is now in the public domain.

See also
List of American films of 1968
Columbia University
Columbia University protests of 1968
Cinéma vérité
Political Cinema

Notes

External links

Columbia University 1968 by Frank da Cruz
 

1968 films
Black-and-white documentary films
American documentary films
1968 documentary films
Films set in Columbia University
Documentary films about New York City
1968 in New York City
Documentary films about American politics
Articles containing video clips
American black-and-white films
1960s English-language films
1960s American films